"" is a short Eucharistic chant that has been set to music by many composers. It dates to the 13th century, first recorded in a central Italian Franciscan manuscript (Chicago, Newberry Library, 24). A Reichenau manuscript of the 14th century attributes it to Pope Innocent (variously identified as Innocent III, Innocent IV, Innocent V, or Innocent VI)

During the Middle Ages it was sung at the elevation of the Eucharist during the consecration at Mass. It was also used frequently during Benediction of the Blessed Sacrament.

The prayer is a meditation on Jesus's Real Presence in the Blessed Sacrament, and ties it to the redemptive meaning of suffering in the life of all believers.

Text
Latin
Ave verum corpus, natum
de Maria Virgine,
vere passum, immolatum
in cruce pro homine
cuius latus perforatum
fluxit aqua et sanguine:
esto nobis prægustatum
in mortis examine.

O Iesu dulcis, O Iesu pie,
O Iesu, fili Mariae.
Miserere mei. Amen.
 
Hail, true Body, born
of the Virgin Mary,
truly suffered, sacrificed
on the cross for mankind,
from whose pierced side
water and blood flowed:
Be for us a foretaste [of the Heavenly banquet]
in the trial of death!

O sweet Jesus, O holy Jesus,
O Jesus, son of Mary,
have mercy on me. Amen.

Musical settings
Musical settings include Mozart's motet Ave verum corpus (K. 618), as well as settings by William Byrd and Sir Edward Elgar. Not all composers set the whole text. For example, Mozart's setting finishes with "in mortis examine", Elgar's with "fili Mariae". Marc-Antoine Charpentier composed three versions: H.233, H.266, H.329. 

There is a version by Franz Liszt [Searle 44], and also ones by Camille Saint-Saëns, Orlande de Lassus, Imant Raminsh, Alexandre Guilmant, William Mathias, Colin Mawby, Malcolm Archer and Jack Gibbons. Liszt also composed a fantasy on Mozart's work, preceded by a version of Allegri's celebrated Miserere, under the title  [Searle 461 – two versions]. Versions of this fantasy for orchestra [Searle 360] and piano four-hands [Searle 633] follow closely the second version for piano. 

There is also a version for organ [Searle 658] with the title . The chant is included Poulenc's opera Dialogues of the Carmelites. The composer wrote a different "Ave verum corpus" in 1952. 

Mozart's version, with instruments only, was adapted by Pyotr Ilyich Tchaikovsky as one of the sections of his Mozartiana, a tribute to Mozart. A 20th century version is that by Colin Mawby and from the 21st century there are settings by the Swedish composer Fredrik Sixten and the English composer Philip Stopford.

References

 Ave verum corpus natum. The Canterbury Dictionary of Hymnology. Canterbury Press (2013).
 Guido Maria Dreves: Analecta Hymnica Medii Aevi (1886), 54.257.

External links

 
Mozart's "Ave verum corpus" at ChoralWiki
Elgar's "Ave verum" at ChoralWiki
William Byrd's "Ave verum corpus" at ChoralWiki
William Byrd's "Ave verum corpus" as interactive hypermedia at the BinAural Collaborative Hypertext site
 Version in Gregorian chant

Latin-language Christian hymns